LAID AS or simply Laid is based in Oslo, Norway. It was founded by Industrial Designer Line Iren Andersen and Business Graduate Karianne Rønning in 2007. The company was formed on the basis of Andersen's master's degree project in Industrial Design at the Oslo School of Architecture and Design where she designed a sex toy set for couples.   The fundamental thought in Andersen's designs and following vision for the company, is to let form and design overcome the taboos that hinder the availability and purchase of sex toys. The company was formally registered in 2009 and introduced its first products in 2010. Its visual identity and communication has been developed by Skin Designstudio Through this successful collaboration Laid has received the Norwegian Design Council’s Award for Design Excellence (2010) and won Silver at the European Design Awards (2010) for its packaging, as well as Red Dot Design Award for Communication.  The Laid product range includes several products for both men and women.

References

External links
 Laid Homepage

Sex toy manufacturers
Manufacturing companies based in Oslo
2007 establishments in Norway